James Sheafe (November 16, 1755December 5, 1829) was a United States representative and Senator from New Hampshire. Born in Portsmouth in the Province of New Hampshire, he completed preparatory studies and graduated from Harvard College in 1774. He engaged in mercantile pursuits, was a member of the New Hampshire House of Representatives from 1788 to 1790, a member of the New Hampshire Senate in 1791, 1793 and 1799, and a member of the state Executive Council in 1799.

Sheafe was elected as a Federalist to the Sixth Congress (March 4, 1799 – March 3, 1801); he was then elected to the U.S. Senate and served from March 4, 1801, until his resignation on June 14, 1802. He was an unsuccessful candidate for Governor of New Hampshire in 1816 and died in Portsmouth; interment was in St. John's Church Cemetery.

In 1815, Sheafe was elected a member of the American Antiquarian Society.

References

External links 
 

1755 births
1829 deaths
Members of the New Hampshire House of Representatives
New Hampshire state senators
United States senators from New Hampshire
Harvard College alumni
Politicians from Portsmouth, New Hampshire
Federalist Party United States senators
Federalist Party members of the United States House of Representatives from New Hampshire
Members of the American Antiquarian Society
People of colonial New Hampshire